James (or Jim) Macdonnell, Macdonell, or McDonnell may refer to:

 James MacDonnell (physician) (1763–1845), Irish physician
 James Macdonell (British Army officer) (1781–1857), Scottish officer of the British Army
 James Macdonell (journalist) (1841–1879), Scottish journalist
 James MacDonnell (cricketer) (1841–1891), Irish cricketer
 James Macdonnell (Canadian politician) (1884–1973), Canadian lawyer and parliamentarian
 James Smith McDonnell (1899–1980), aviation pioneer and founder of McDonnell Aircraft Corporation, later McDonnell Douglas
 Jim McDonnell (baseball) (1922–1993), Major League Baseball catcher
 James MacDonnell (Newfoundland politician) (1890–1924), member of the Newfoundland House of Assembly
 Jim McDonnell (born 1948), Australian artist, member of Optronic Kinetics art collective in Sydney in the 1970s
 Jim McDonell (born 1954), Canadian MPP
 Jim McDonnell (boxer) (born 1960), British boxer
 Jim McDonnell (sheriff) (born 1959), sheriff of Los Angeles County, California
 James McDonnell (rugby league) (born 2000), rugby league footballer for the Wigan Warriors

See also
 James MacDonald (disambiguation)